Mauro Nardi, stage name of Antonio Borrelli (April 26, 1954) is an Italian singer.

Biography 
Born in Naples on April 26, 1954, began his career at age 19 as part of an RAI orchestra conducted by maestro Gianni Desideri, Without the transmission Senza Rete on Rai Uno in Naples, with the agency ATAF Antonio Fusco and Franco Baldi. In 1981 he participated in the Festival of Naples with the song Doce e amaro.<ref>Antonio Sciotti - Cantanapoli. Enciclopedia del Festival della Canzone Napoletana 1952-1981, Luca Torre editore (2011)</ref>

Become friends with Nino D'Angelo, who wrote two songs for Nardi, the first and the second LP Ricordi and Illusione, containing other songs written by him on the issues of melodic song and Neapolitan love, in a period in which he went to fashion's song "jacket" given in vogue a decade before by the likes of Mario Merola, Pino Mauro and Mario Trevi. From that moment he turned the music generation with the birth of neomelodici as Mauro Nardi, Nino D'Angelo, Gigi Finizio, Carmelo Zappulla, Franco Moreno and Mauro Caputo. In later years and still performs various tours in Italy and abroad, and sings in several street parties.

Mauro Nardi is also an interpreter of Neapolitan melodrama in theater, in fact, is the protagonist of the Third Elementary skit written by Alberto Sciotti and based on one of the biggest musical hits of the same name by Nardi. This skit as well as Nardi, includes among its performers also: Fortuna Robustelli, Angelo Dei Visconti, Franco Calone and Silvia Muccino.

In 1987 he participated for the first time in the program of Rai 1 Napoli prima e dopo, where he performs songs from the classic Neapolitan song, over the years there will also participate in other occasions, with the last occurred in 2005 In 2000 and 2001 he participated transmission Viva Napoli, led by Mike Bongiorno and Loretta Goggi on Rete 4. in 2006 to make a tour in the United States with Gigi D'Alessio.

On 27 May 2011 he took part, along with other colleagues at the concert held in the Piazza del Plebiscito in Naples, in favor of the election of the candidate of the PDL Gianni Lettieri for mayor of the city.  In April 2012, Nardi again with his band to Atlantic City where he holds three shows, including two with Francesco Merola.

 Recordings (selection) 

 1979 - Napule 'e pulecenella 1980 - Ricordi 1981 - Tu nun saje fingere 1982 - Ragazzina 1983 - Fragola e margherite 1984 - Fidanzati 1985 - Fore 'a scola 1985 - ...Un'estate al mare 1986 - ...E arriva lui 1987 - Napulegno 1988 - Goccia di mare 1989 - Io ti avrò 1990 - 25 maggio 1990 
 1992 - Ho fatto tredici 1993 - Musica e poesia 1993 - Quando il cuore s'innamora 1994 - Storie vere 1994 - La magia di Napoli 1995 - Metropolis 1996 - Meravigliosamente 1997 - Fotografie 1999 - ...E fu subito Nardi 2000 - N'appuntamento 2001 - Mauro Nardi? 2004 - Neoclassica napoletana 2004 - Classicheggiando vol.1 2004 - Classicheggiando vol.2 2004 - Classicheggiando vol.3 2005 - Evergreen 2005 - Mauro Nardi canta Merola 2005 - Na fabbrica e buscie 2005 - 60x70 2006 - '''Nu pentito 'nnammurato
 2007 - Vivere e murì
 2008 - Amò amò
 2010 - Oltre la vita
 2013 - Cantammore
 2015 - La mia balera
 2017 - Amori
 2020 - N'ammore a cinque stelle

External links 
Site official (Italian)
YouTube official
Facebook Official Page

References 

1954 births
Musicians from Naples
Italian male singers
Living people
Italian musicians
Italian-language singers